CHOM-FM - radio station in Montreal, Canada
 Children's Hospital of Michigan - full service pediatric hospital in Detroit, Michigan